All the Time in the World may refer to:

Film and television
"All the Time in the World", an episode from season 5 of the TV series Alias
"All the Time in the World", an episode of the TV series Tales of Tomorrow adapting Arthur C. Clarke's short story
Spy Kids: All the Time in the World, the fourth installment of the Spy Kids franchise
All the Time in the World (2014 film), a 2014 documentary film by Suzanne Crocker

Music
All the Time in the World (Lazlo Bane album), 2002
All the Time in the World (Jump5 album), 2002
All the Time in the World (Lowen & Navarro album)
"All the Time in the World" (Dr. Hook song), 1978
"All the Time in the World", a song by Deep Purple from the 2013 album Now What?!
"We Have All the Time in the World", a 1969 Louis Armstrong song used in the James Bond film On Her Majesty's Secret Service

Literature
All the Time in the World (book), by E. L. Doctorow
"All the Time in the World", a 1952 short story by Arthur C. Clarke